Sir John Call, 1st Baronet (30 June 1731 – 1 March 1801) was an English engineer and baronet.

He was born at Fenny Park, Tiverton, Devon, educated at Blundell's School and went to India at the age of 17 with Benjamin Robins, the chief engineer and captain-general of artillery in the East India Company's settlements. After the death of Robins, Call became engineer-in-chief, and eventually chief engineer with a seat on the Governor's Council. Robert Clive strongly recommended Call for the Governorship of Madras, but he had to return to England on the death of his father on 31 December 1766.

On his return, he became High Sheriff of Cornwall for 1771–72 and was elected MP for Callington in 1784, a seat he held until his death. In 1784 he also became a partner in the Pybus and Son banking house and was created the 1st Baronet Call in 1791.

Call built Whiteford House near Stoke Climsland, Cornwall (demolished in 1913) and the nearby folly, Whiteford Temple, now owned by the Landmark Trust. He also built the reproduction Civil War fort on the summit of Kit Hill and was responsible for the construction of Bodmin Gaol in 1779.

He was elected a Fellow of the Royal Society in 1775, and a Fellow of the Society of Antiquaries in 1785.

He married Philadelphia, the daughter and coheiress of William Batty of Kingston upon Thames; they had two sons and four daughters. His eldest son, William Pratt Call, succeeded him, becoming the 2nd Baronet Call on his father's death in 1801.
He became blind seven years before he died, of apoplexy, at his home in Old Burlington Street, London, and was buried at St Margaret's old churchyard, Lee, Kent (now in the borough of Lewisham), where there is a grade II* listed monument to his memory.

References

1732 births
1801 deaths
People from Tiverton, Devon
People educated at Blundell's School
Engineers from Devon
Baronets in the Baronetage of Great Britain
Fellows of the Royal Society
Fellows of the Society of Antiquaries of London
British East India Company Army officers
Members of the Parliament of Great Britain for Callington
British MPs 1784–1790
British MPs 1790–1796
British MPs 1796–1800
High Sheriffs of Cornwall
Members of the Parliament of the United Kingdom for constituencies in Cornwall
UK MPs 1801–1802